Stenoptilia convexa is a moth of the family Pterophoridae. It is found in Russia's Caucasus region.

The wingspan is 20–22 mm. The forewings are coffee brown, nearly without markings. Adults have been recorded in July.

References

Moths described in 1998
convexa
Moths of Europe